The Excellence Initiative of the German Council of Science and Humanities and the German Research Foundation (DFG) aims to promote cutting-edge research and to create outstanding conditions for young scholars at universities, to deepen cooperation between disciplines and institutions, to strengthen international cooperation of research, and to enhance the international appeal of excellent German universities. It is the result of lengthy negotiations between the federal government and the German states.

Since almost all German universities are public (most private universities do not have the official German "Universitätsstatus"), and therefore mainly paid by taxes and generally egalitarian, there is no German Ivy League of private higher education institutions. However, the Excellence Initiative aims to strengthen some selected public universities more than others in order to raise their international visibility. Thus, the German "Universities of Excellence" are sometimes considered the German Ivy League of public institutions, and these universities are commonly referred to by the media as "elite universities". The initiative is conducted by the DFG together with the German Science and Humanities Council (WR). More than 30 universities in total received funding. It includes three lines of funding:
 The establishment of more than 40 research schools for young scientists and PhD candidates, which will receive €1 million each per year.
 The creation of thirty so-called Clusters of Excellence, that connect universities with leading German research institutes and businesses. Annually, these clusters will receive around €6.5 million each to fund their work.
 The selection of 11 Universities of Excellence, which will be funded highly for their "future concepts", i.e.,  institutional strategies to promote top-level university research. Particularly this third line of funding has drawn appreciable international attention, both in academia and media.

Altogether €2.7 billion (€1.9 billion for 2007–2012) of additional funds will be distributed over the coming five years, most of this coming from the federal government. The WR is responsible for the third line of funding, and the DFG is responsible for the first and second lines of funding.

Results

Winners: Future Concept 2019 (Current projects) 

11 future concepts across 13 universities were selected for funding in 2019. Six universities retained their status for a third time: RWTH Aachen, FU Berlin (as part of the Berlin University Alliance), Heidelberg University, University of Konstanz, LMU Munich, and Technical University of Munich. Three further universities retained their status for a second consecutive time: HU Berlin (as part of the Berlin University Alliance), TU Dresden, and the University of Tübingen. The Karlsruhe Institute of Technology returned to excellence status for a second time after having been funded in the first round (2006). The three first-time excellence universities are the University of Bonn, University of Hamburg, and TU Berlin (as part of the Berlin University Alliance).

Winners: Future Concept 2012–2019 (Completed projects) 

Out of the 140 universities in Germany 11 universities were chosen, among them five new winners (HU Berlin, University of Bremen, University of Cologne, TU Dresden, University of Tübingen) and six title holders: RWTH Aachen, FU Berlin, Heidelberg University, University of Konstanz, LMU Munich, and Technical University of Munich. As in 2006 and 2007, also other universities were awarded for special clusters of excellence and renowned graduate schools.

Winners: Future Concept 2006/2007–2012 (Completed projects) 

The funding for a future concept does often, but not necessarily result in a superior overall budget compared to other German universities. For example, due to its small size, the University of Constance is, despite this additional funding, not included in the top 20 funded universities in Germany.

Current international standing
According to the Third European Report on Science & Technology Indicators, an official document compiled by the European Commission, four of the Universities of Excellence are among Europe's top 10 universities: Technical University of Munich (joint 3rd), Freiburg (joint 6th), Karlsruhe (joint 6th), and Heidelberg (joint 9th).

In the Academic Ranking of World Universities 2012, Technical University of Munich (53), LMU Munich (60), Heidelberg (62), and Freiburg (99) are included in the global top 100, heading the field of German universities by those criteria.

Eight of the eleven Universities of Excellence are included in the world's top 250 universities, according to the QS World University Ranking 2012: Technical University of Munich (53); Heidelberg (55); LMU Munich (60); Free University of Berlin (87); Humboldt University of Berlin (130); Tübingen (144); RWTH Aachen (150); Cologne (247). The Times Higher Education World University Ranking 2012 ranks 8 of these 11 Universities of Excellence among the world's 250 top universities: LMU Munich (45); Heidelberg (73); Technical University of Munich (88); Humboldt University of Berlin (109); Free University of Berlin (151); RWTH Aachen (168); Tübingen (187); Konstanz (194).

Federal Education Minister Annette Schavan said following the awards ceremony, "The excellence initiative is writing scientific history. Research at German universities finds itself on a successful, international course."

Winners: Graduate Schools (Completed projects) 

Source: Federal Ministry of Education and Research

Winners: Clusters of Excellence (Partly completed projects)

Reception
Whether the Excellence Initiative has had a positive effect is currently a matter of debate. A report by the WZB Berlin Social Science Centre indicates that the program failed to create more diverse education options and produced little in the way of lasting change. Additionally, the Goethe Institut claims that an additional criticism is that "competition up to now has focussed exclusively on the research rather than the teaching at universities", that prevailing qualitative imbalances in East and West German education systems may potentially be perpetuated via the program (by favoring more established Western universities over their younger Eastern counterparts), and, furthermore, that the funding may actually be insufficient to achieve the goal of creating "globally competitive universities".

However, an international commission led by physicist Dieter Imboden of the ETH Zurich in Switzerland praised the program, saying it had a "very positive" influence on higher education in Germany, and recommending it be extended and further developed.

Notes and references 

College and university associations and consortia in Germany
Lists of universities and colleges in Europe
Technical universities and colleges in Germany